"This Is My Life" is a song by German recording artist Elli Erl, the winner of the second season of the reality television talent show Deutschland sucht den Superstar, broadcast in 2004. Written and produced by DSDS judge Dieter Bohlen, it served as Erl's coronation song. Released on March 22, 2004 in German-speaking Europe, it debuted at number three on the German Singles Chart and peaked at number six in Austria and number 11 in Switzerland. In total, the song sold 100,000 copies and was later included on her debut album, Shout It Out (2004).

Formats and track listings

Credits and personnel
Credits taken from Shout It Out liner notes.

 Arrangement, co-producer — Lalo Titenkov
 Artwork — Ronald Reinsberg 
 Guitar — Jörn Heilbut
 Lyrics, music, production — Dieter Bohlen
 Mixing, co-producer — Jeo

Charts

Weekly charts

Year-end charts

References

2004 singles
2004 songs
Songs written by Dieter Bohlen
Hansa Records singles
Sony BMG singles
Song recordings produced by Dieter Bohlen
Deutschland sucht den Superstar